Jhaorihella is a Gram-negative and aerobic genus of bacteria from the family of Rhodobacteraceae with one known species (Jhaorihella thermophila).Jhaorihella thermophila has been isolated from a hot spring from the coast of the Green Island in Taiwan.

References

Rhodobacteraceae
Bacteria genera
Monotypic bacteria genera